Scott Bomar (born June 15, 1974) is a Memphis-based musician, Emmy Award-winning film composer, Grammy-nominated music producer, and recording engineer. Scott Bomar's songs are represented by Downtown Music Publishing.

Early years
A native of Memphis, Tennessee, Bomar was introduced to music at an early age, aided by his mother's record collection and regular exposure to Memphis' legendary musicians.

Impala
Bomar's music career began in the early 1990s. Impala, consisting of guitarist John Stivers, saxophonist Justin Thompson, drummer Jeff Goggans, and Bomar on bass, gained national prominence on the strength of their debut album, El Rancho Reverbo, co-produced by Roland Janes. They signed with Estrus Records.

Following the release of Kings of the Strip, Impala toured relentlessly, appearing at a slew of garage rock festivals (including Garage Shock, Sleezefest, Crap Out, and Dixie Fried) and alongside guitar legends Dick Dale and Davie Allen and the Arrows.

Over the past decade, Impala has been featured on numerous occasions in film and on television, most notably for their arrangement of Henry Mancini's "Experiment in Terror," and Duane Eddy's "Stalkin'", as a medley, which appeared in the Chuck Barris biopic Confessions of a Dangerous Mind. The band's current lineup includes trumpeter/keyboardist, former Bobby "Blue" Bland sideman, and Bo-Keys member Marc Franklin.

In 2018 Impala released In the Late Hours on Bomar's Electraphonic Recording imprint.  When premiering the song, "The Insomniac", Rolling Stone said it "...combines surf-guitar nostalgia with a minor-key, spy-movie-worthy riffage. Together, those influences form a truly unique sound, one that’s retro without lapsing into mimicry."

The Bo-Keys and Al Green
Bomar gained individual prominence playing bass for legendary Stax artists such as Rufus and Carla Thomas, Eddie Floyd, William Bell, Sun Records pioneer Rosco Gordon, and Motown session guitarist Dennis Coffey, both in studio session and on the road.

In 1998, he formed The Bo-Keys, a Memphis soul/funk group featuring former Stax/Volt, Hi Records and Isaac Hayes session players Skip Pitts, Howard Grimes and Ben Cauley.

Following the success of The Bo-Keys' critically acclaimed album, The Royal Sessions, Bomar was asked to serve as assistant engineer on Al Green's comeback album, I Can't Stop, which was nominated for a Grammy in 2003. In 2005, Scott re-joined producer Willie Mitchell to record Al Green's Everything's Okay.

In 2005, The Bo-Keys performed on the film and soundtrack for Hustle & Flow as well as the Paramount/Nickelodeon animated feature Barnyard, directed by Bob Oedekirk. Three years later, they appeared in the film Soul Men, performing on-screen with Samuel L. Jackson and Bernie Mack. The group also added three songs to the film's soundtrack (produced by Bomar), including Anthony Hamilton's "Soul Music," which was nominated for a Grammy in 2009.

The Bo-Keys have performed at various festivals, including multiple appearances at The Ponderosa Stomp, London’s Barbican Performing Arts Centre, and Lincoln Center’s Midsummer Nights Swing Series.

Collaborations with Craig Brewer
In 2005, Bomar composed the score for Craig Brewer's award-winning film Hustle & Flow. Touted as Memphis soul meets hip hop, Bomar's work on the film has received much critical acclaim.

Bomar's collaboration with Brewer continued in 2006 when he served as Executive Music Producer and Composer for the film Black Snake Moan. In preparation for the recording process, Bomar took Brewer and lead actor Samuel L. Jackson on a road trip through Mississippi, during which the trio met with a slew of blues musicians, working to parlay classics like "Stackolee" and "That Black Snake Moan" into modern sinister laments. Upon returning to the studio, Bomar enlisted musicians rooted in Memphis, including harmonica legend Charlie Musselwhite, and The North Mississippi Allstars, the contemporary blues/rock group of Jim Dickinson and his sons Luther and Cody. He was later joined by the stars of the film, Samuel L. Jackson and Christina Ricci, to record songs subsequently performed on screen.

Bomar served as producer with Brewer on the MTV New Media series "$5 COVER" in 2009.

Bomar most recently composed the original score for Craig Brewer's, Dolemite Is My Name.

Recent accomplishment notes

Bomar won an Emmy for "Best Original Music" for the documentary, I Am a Man: From Memphis, A Lesson in Life.

In 2010, he co-produced and engineered Cyndi Lauper’s Memphis Blues at his Memphis studio, Electraphonic Recording. The album spent 13 weeks at #1 on the Billboard Blues chart and was nominated for a Grammy in the Best Traditional Blues Album category.

Bomar previously served as Trustee and President of the Memphis Chapter of NARAS.

Bomar returned to film in 2010 as Producer/Composer of the soundtrack for Losers Take All, which was recorded at his Electraphonic studio.

Filmography (partial)
 Dolemite Is My Name (2019), Composer
 Mississippi Grind (2015), Composer
 Losers Take All (2011), Composer
 I am a Man: From Memphis a Lesson in Life (2009), Composer and Main Title Producer for “I am a Man” // EMMY WINNER
 $5 Cover: Memphis (2009), Producer and Composer
 Soul Men (2008), Producer on “Private Number,” “Memphis Train,” and “Soul Music”
 Gospel Hill (2008), Composer and Music Supervisor
 Black Snake Moan (2006), Executive Music Producer/Composer
 Barnyard: The Original Party Animals (2006), Producer on "Kick It"
 Hustle & Flow (2005), Composer – Original Score
 Confessions of a Dangerous Mind (2002), Producer on "Experiment in Terror"

Discography (partial)
 Don Bryant, You Make Me Feel - Producer/Engineer/Songwriter // GRAMMY NOMINATED
Dolemite Is My Name, Music From the Netflix Film – Artist
 Don Bryant, Don't Give Up On Love – Producer/Mixer/Songwriter // BLUES MUSIC AWARD NOMINATED 
 Liz Brasher, Painted Image – Producer/Engineer
 William Bell, This is Where I Live – Songwriter // GRAMMY WINNER ‘Best Americana Album’ in 2017
 Scott Sharrard, Saving Grace – Producer/Engineer
 Cedric Burnside Project, Descendants of Hill Country – Engineer // GRAMMY NOMINATED
 John Németh, Memphis Grease – Producer and Engineer (Blue Corn Music) BLUES MUSIC AWARD WINNER – BEST SOUL BLUES ALBUM
 Robin McKelle, Heart of Memphis – Producer and Engineer (Sony/Okeh)
 The City Champs, The Set-Up – Producer and Engineer (Electraphonic Records)
 Cyndi Lauper, Memphis Blues – Producer and Engineer (Downtown Records) // GRAMMY NOMINATED
 The Bo-Keys, Got to Get Back ! – Producer and Mixing (Electraphonic Records) // BLUES MUSIC AWARD NOMINATED
 The City Champs, The Safecracker – Producer and Engineer (Electraphonic Records)
 Jay Reatard, Watch Me Fall – Engineer on “I’m Watching You” (Matador Records)
 Soul Men: Original Motion Picture Soundtrack – Producer on “Private Number,” “Memphis Train,” and “Soul Music” (Stax/Concord Records) // GRAMMY NOMINATED
 Black Snake Moan: Music From the Motion Picture – Soundtrack Album Producer (New West Records)
 The Bo-Keys, The Royal Sessions – Producer and Mixing (Electraphonic Records) // W.C. HANDY AWARD NOMINATED
 Calvin Newborn, Newborn – Producer and Mixing (Yellowdog Records)
 Al Green, Everything's OK – Assistant Engineer (Blue Note Records) // GRAMMY NOMINATED
 Al Green, I Can't Stop – Assistant Engineer (Blue Note Records)

Other sources
 Beifuss, John. "Movie with the Memphis Sound," The Commercial Appeal, 3 April 2008.
 Callaghan, Dylan. "Up and Coming Composers," The Hollywood Reporter, 19 April 2005.
 Donahue, Michael. "Moan Music Man," The Commercial Appeal, 21 October 2005.
 Lisle, Andria. "Sam in the Studio," The Memphis Flyer, 7 September 2005.
 Lisle, Andria. "Two Worlds Collide," The Memphis Flyer, 4 November 2005.
 Mehr, Bob. "South by Southwest: Tennessee Heats Up Texas," The Commercial Appeal, 13 March 2008.
 Morris, Chris. "Brewer's Moan Howls North Mississippi Blues," The Hollywood Reporter, 30 November 2006.
 Olsen, Mark. "Back to Memphis, This Time Making the City Moan," The New York Times, 11 February 2007.

References

External links
 
 
 

American male composers
Living people
1974 births
Musicians from Memphis, Tennessee